The Ducati 125 Aurea was a Ducati motorcycle made from 1958 to 1962; it was only superficially different from the Bronco of 1960 to 1966.

The process that produced the Aurea, and the Bronco that followed, was a form of motorcycle marketing that was practiced with this marque at the time.  Ducati's American importer, Berliner Motor Corporation would fly their US dealers to Italy to view the models in Ducati's lineup, alongside a choice of handlebars, seats, gas tanks and fenders that would fit on that model, and the dealers would pick which components in combination with which bike would most likely sell in the US market.  By this process, the 125 cc full-cradle framed 125 TV ended up with the stylish sporty fuel tank of the 125 Sport, a much higher spec model.  Two years later, the Aurea would have its low, racing or "drag bar" style handle bars replaced with upright touring handlebars, and have added knobby, off-road tires, producing the 125 Bronco.

Notes

See also
List of motorcycles of the 1950s

Aurea
Standard motorcycles
Motorcycles introduced in 1958
Single-cylinder motorcycles